Guigues may refer to:

Nobility
 Guigues I of Albon, count of Oisans, Grésivaudan, and Briançonnais
 Guigues III of Albon, also Guigues the Old, count of Albon
 Guigues IV of Albon, count of Albon
 Guigues IV of Forez, count of Forez, Auxerre and Tonnerre
 Guigues V of Albon, count of Albon and Grenoble
 Guigues VI of Viennois, dauphin of Vienne
 Guigues VII of Viennois, dauphin of Vienne
 Guigues VIII of Viennois, dauphin of Vienne

Other notable people
 Guigues Guiffrey, French soldier
 Joseph-Bruno Guigues (1805-1874), Oblate priest

Places
 Saint-Bruno-de-Guigues, often shortened to Guigues, Quebec, Canada
 Saint-Eugène-de-Guigues, Quebec, Canada